René Rutten (born 2 July 1972 in Nijmegen, Gelderland) is a Dutch guitarist for The Gathering. He founded the band with his brother Hans in 1989, and together they released eleven studio albums, four live albums, and four EPs. His latest work with The Gathering was Afterwords, released in 2013.  In 2015 Rutten formed a new band, "Habitants", who released their debut album in 2018.

Discography
With The Gathering:
Always... (1992)
Almost a Dance (1993)
Mandylion (1995)
Adrenaline / Leaves - EP (1996)
Nighttime Birds (1997)
How to Measure a Planet? (1998)
if then else (2000)
Superheat (album) - Live (2000)
Amity - EP (2001)
Black Light District - EP (2002)
In Motion - DVD (2002)
Souvenirs (2003)
Sleepy Buildings - A Semi Acoustic Evening - Live (2004)
Accessories - Rarities and B-Sides - Compilation (2005)
A Sound Relief - DVD (2005)
Home (2006)
A Noise Severe - DVD (2007)
The West Pole (2009)
Disclosure (2012)
Afterwords (2013)
TG25: Live at Doornroosje (2015)
One Self (with his band Habitants) (2018)
Beautiful Distortion (The Gathering album) (2022)

References

External links
René Rutten at The Gathering's official website

1972 births
Living people
Dutch guitarists
Dutch heavy metal guitarists
Dutch male guitarists
People from Nijmegen
21st-century guitarists
21st-century male musicians